Adrian Alexander Konstantin Schultheiss (born 11 August 1988) is a Swedish former competitive figure skater. He is the 2006 Swedish national champion, the 2004–2005 Swedish junior national champion, and the 2006 Nordic Champion. He is the first Swedish skater to win a Junior Grand Prix event, which he did in 2005.

Career
Adrian Schultheiss was born in Kungsbacka, Sweden and began skating at the age of three. He was the Swedish novice champion in 2002 before debuting internationally the next season. Schultheiss skated as a junior through the end of the 2008 season, although by 2005 he had already begun competing as a senior in some international events. In 2006, Schultheiss won the Swedish National championships.  In 2007–08, he skated in both senior and junior events and finished a career-best 6th at the 2008 Europeans. He was 13th at 2008 Worlds. The next season, he was 18th at both events.

Schultheiss was selected to represent Sweden at the 2010 Winter Olympics based on his showing at the 2010 Europeans; he finished 15th at the Olympics. At the 2010 Worlds, he skated a strong long program with a quadruple toe loop to finish in the top ten for the first time in his career.

Schultheiss is known for choosing unusual concepts for his programs, most notably his craziness-themed 2009–10 long program, which he skated wearing a straitjacket costume. He has stated that "it's more interesting and important when people try to make some difference from all points of view" and that "if you watch the classical [music]... people get bored easy. You need variation. That's what I'm trying to show."

Schultheiss is the first skater from Sweden to land a quadruple jump in competition, first at the 2010 Winter Olympics in Vancouver and later at the 2010 Worlds.

Schultheiss parted ways with coach Evgeni Loutkov after 2010 Skate America and began working with Johanna Dahlstrand and Maria Bergqvist. As part of his preparation for the 2011–12 season, he spent eight weeks in Delaware with coach Priscilla Hill. He missed the Swedish Championships due to a back injury and underwent surgery the week before Christmas.

Programs

Competitive highlights

GP: Grand Prix; JGP: Junior Grand Prix

Detailed results

References

External links

 
 Official website of Adrian Schultheiss
 

Swedish male single skaters
1988 births
People from Kungsbacka
Living people
Figure skaters at the 2010 Winter Olympics
Olympic figure skaters of Sweden
Sportspeople from Halland County